Hola Prystan Raion was one of the 18 administrative raions (a district) of Kherson Oblast in southern Ukraine. Its administrative center was located in the city of Hola Prystan, which was incorporated separately as a city of oblast significance and did not belong to the raion. The raion was abolished on 18 July 2020 as part of the administrative reform of Ukraine, which reduced the number of raions of Kherson Oblast to five. The area of Hola Pristan Raion was merged into Skadovsk Raion. The last estimate of the raion population was 

At the time of disestablishment, the raion consisted of three hromadas:
 Bekhtery rural hromada with the administration in the selo of Bekhtery;
 Chulakivka rural hromada with the administration in the selo of Chulakivka;
 Dolmativka rural hromada with the administration in the selo of Dolmativka.

The raion was subdivided into 21 rural communities known as silrada that included 46 villages and 6 rural settlements.
Zaliznyi Port, one of Ukraine's most popular resorts, was located in Hola Prystan Raion.

References

Former raions of Kherson Oblast
1923 establishments in Ukraine
Ukrainian raions abolished during the 2020 administrative reform